Nonane is a linear alkane hydrocarbon with the chemical formula C9H20. It is a colorless, flammable liquid, occurring primarily in the component of the petroleum distillate fraction commonly called kerosene, which is used as a heating, tractor, and jet fuel. Nonane is also used as a solvent, distillation chaser, fuel additive, and a component in biodegradable detergents. 

Nonane has 35 structural isomers.  

Its substituent form is nonyl. Its cycloalkane counterpart is cyclononane, (C9H18).

Unlike most alkanes, the numeric prefix in its name is from Latin, not Greek. (A name using a Greek prefix would be  enneane.)

Combustion reactions
Nonane undergoes combustion reactions that are similar to other alkanes. In the presence of sufficient oxygen, nonane burns to form water and carbon dioxide.

C9H20 + 14O2 → 9CO2 + 10H2O

When insufficient oxygen is available for complete combustion, the burning products include carbon monoxide.

2C9H20 + 19O2 → 18CO + 20H2O

See also
Higher alkanes
List of isomers of nonane

References

External links

MSDS at Oxford University
List of isomers of nonane

Alkanes